The Detroit Golf Club (abbreviated to DGC) is a private golf club located in Detroit, Wayne County, Michigan in the middle of a neighborhood area on north side of the city near the University of Detroit Mercy and Palmer Woods Historic District. Bert Way designed the original 6-hole course. It was expanded to 9 holes, and finally Donald Ross built the current 36-hole course. The club grounds crew maintains two courses, the North and the South Course. The head pro is Josh Upson. Starting in 2019, Detroit Golf Club began hosting the Rocket Mortgage Classic, a new annual PGA Tour event.

History
The Detroit Golf Club was founded in 1899 by William R. Farrand and several of his friends. Originally the Club was limited to 100 members. They rented a  plot of farmland at 6 Mile and Woodward, and a 6-hole course layout was created. In 1900 the course added 3 holes, making it a 9-hole course. The membership was increased to 200 in 1902. At that time  of land were purchased at 6 Mile and Hamilton, and an 18-hole course was developed.

In 1906 the Club was   formally opened, and membership fees were raised to $250. In 1913 additional property was bought, and Donald Ross was asked to survey the property. Ross determined that two courses of 18 holes could be built on the land. Horace Rackham paid $100,000 for the 36-hole course to be built to the DGC at a cost.

In 1916 Albert Kahn started construction on a new clubhouse, which was completed in 1918. The brother of Donald Ross, Alec Ross, became Club Professional, a position he held until 1945, a total of 31 years.

In 1922 club membership was increased to 650, and they decided to stay open year round. In 1929 the Fred Wardell Caddy House was built, at a cost around $40,000.

During World War II, Club activities were limited due to gas rationing, and in 1945, Alex Ross retired as Club Professional. Golf star Horton Smith was hired as the Club Pro, and in 1959 was elected into the Professional Golfers Association Hall of Fame. In 1963 Smith died, and Walter Burkemo was hired.

The club added new amenities: tennis courts, a cart garage, and a crystal dining room. Burkemo was succeeded by George Bayer. The current club pro is Josh Upson. The club also contains a pool for members, and sponsors a swim team.

Location
The Club, located on the North side of Detroit, near such landmarks as Palmer Park and the University of Detroit Mercy, is separated from the former Palmer Park Golf Course by Pontchartrain Blvd. on the East, and Fairway Drive on the West. It shares a small border with 7 Mile on the North, and a large border with McNichols (6 Mile) on the South.

Major tournaments
1911 Western Amateur
1992 U.S. Mid-Amateur
2019 Rocket Mortgage Classic
2020 Rocket Mortgage Classic
2021 Rocket Mortgage Classic

Club Tournaments
Men's
 Men's Golf League
 Men's Ringer Board
 Men's Golf Fund
 Men's Opening Day
 Men's Old Pal
 President's Cup
 Horton Smith Tournament
 Men's Spring Medal Play
 The Whistler
 The Hummer
 Men's Club Championship
 Men's Senior Club Championship
 Men's Member-Member
 Men's Closing Day
 Junior Boys Club Championship

Women's
 Women's Corkscrew Opener
 Women's 18-Hole League
 Girls Night Out
 Women's Detroit Metro League
 Four Girl Team
 Ladies' Cup
 Women's Medal Play
 Women's Texas Scramble I & II
 Sundancer Invitational
 Grandmother-Senior Event
 Women's Club Championship
 Women's Member-Member
 Women's Ryder Cup
 Women's Closing Day- 2Tall/2Small

Couple's
 Nine and Dine
 Couple's Golf League
 Memorial Day Scramble
 DGC Caddie Scholarship Event
 Patriot Day
 Labor Day Scramble
 Husband-Wife Championship

Family Golf Events
 Mother's Day Tournament
 Father's Day Tournament
 Junior Golf

Changes for the PGA Tour Event
On October 11, 2010, the Detroit Golf Club bid for the Rocket Mortgage Classic on the PGA Tour.  The event has been hosted on the North course from 2019 through 2022.  To prepare several of the holes were lengthened, and trees around the greens and tee boxes have also been removed. Parking is made available in the adjacent Palmer Park and the surrounding area, with the University of Detroit Mercy and the Michigan State Fairgrounds serving as other possible parking locations.  In 2022, Detroit Golf Club announced golf architect Tyler Rae would look at drainage improvements.

Courses
Both courses have a snack shack next to a combined tee. The 13th for the South and the 14th for the North. Water hazards can be found on the North and South. Both courses are also bordered by beautiful houses that belong to many notable residents such as Jerome Bettis, Aretha Franklin, John Conyers. and many more.

North Course
The North Course is longer than the South by 870 yards. According to the original Donald Ross design, the 8th tee should be the 1st tee, and the 7th tee should be the 9th. Distinctive features include the bent tree between the 7th and 8th hole. As a sapling, Native Americans bent the tree to serve as a marker for the original Indian Trail between Detroit  and Pontiac. The original clubhouse was situated where the 12th green is today, pipes can still be seen a distance behind the green.

South Course
The South Course has two combined tees. The 3rd and 9th, and the 5th and the 8th. The 10th tee is the most elevated at the DGC. In the early 1980s, the 13th tee was combined with the 14th tee on the North in front of the shack.

Miscellaneous
 The Club has a free membership for the Mayor of Detroit.
 Many Detroit stars such as Justin Verlander, Gerald Laird, Jim Leyland, Jerome Bettis, Jim Schwartz, and many others have or still do play there.
 The Club has tennis courts and a pool, for the tennis and swimming teams, respectively.
 The Club has a caddie program that participates in The Evans Scholars Foundation
 The Club became racially integrated in 1986.

See also
Country Club of Detroit
Sports in Detroit

References

External links
Detroit Golf Club website
North Course Information
South Course Information

Golf clubs and courses in Michigan
Clubs and societies in Michigan
Sports venues in Detroit
Organizations based in Detroit
Golf clubs and courses designed by Donald Ross
Event venues established in 1899
1899 establishments in Michigan